Kokob Tesfagabriel Solomon (born 4 June 1994) is an Eritrean long-distance runner. In 2018, she competed in the women's half marathon at the 2018 IAAF World Half Marathon Championships held in Valencia, Spain. She finished in 38th place.

Career 

In 2015, she competed in the women's half marathon at the 2015 African Games held in Brazzaville, Republic of Congo. She finished in 4th place.

In 2017, she competed in the senior women's race at the 2017 IAAF World Cross Country Championships held in Kampala, Uganda. She finished in 73rd place.

In 2019, she represented Eritrea at the 2019 African Games held in Rabat, Morocco. She competed in the women's half marathon and she finished in 12th place with a time of 1:15:33.

In 2021, she competed in the women's marathon at the 2020 Summer Olympics.

References

External links 
 

Living people
1994 births
Place of birth missing (living people)
Eritrean female long-distance runners
Eritrean female cross country runners
African Games competitors for Eritrea
Athletes (track and field) at the 2015 African Games
Athletes (track and field) at the 2019 African Games
Athletes (track and field) at the 2020 Summer Olympics
Olympic athletes of Eritrea
Olympic female marathon runners